La Chanson Perdue is an album by the American musician Geno Delafose, released in 1998. He is credited with his band, French Rockin' Boogie. Delafose considered the album to be a combination of Creole zydeco and Cajun music; however, the title of the album ("The Lost Song") in part refers to the popularity of zydeco overtaking traditional Creole music. Delafose supported the album with a North American tour.

Production
Recorded at Ultrasonic Studios, New Orleans, the album was produced by Scott Billington. Delafose switched between piano accordion and diatonic button accordion. Most of the songs are sung in French. Christine Balfa played acoustic guitar on several songs; Dirk Powell played fiddle.

Critical reception

The Province deemed the album "edgy and raw with all the moonshine-fuelled fire of a jam session at a back-porch crawfish boil." The Orlando Sentinel noted that "Delafose is not a commanding singer, but his simple, unadorned vocals are full of the restrained longing that infuses the old Cajun and Creole tunes." 

The Baltimore Sun wrote that, "in Creole and Cajun French, accordionist Delafose pines away for lost love, launches lilting waltzes and kicks back with an irresistible dance beat." The Wall Street Journal determined that Delafose, "perhaps zydeco's ultimate neo-traditionalist, borrows heavily from the Cajun repertoire and forges a distinctive approach that is at once rhythmic and romantic."

Track listing

References

1998 albums
Rounder Records albums
Cajun music albums
Zydeco albums